Felix Gordon Veitch (1887 – July 4, 1946) was a Jamaican Baptist minister, medical practitioner and politician, representing the Jamaica Labour Party (JLP) in pre-independent Jamaica. He served as the first speaker of the House of Representatives (1945-1946).

Early life and education
Veitch was born in 1887 in St Ann, Jamaica. He was the son of agriculturist James Veitch and his wife Elsie Jane Gordon.

Political career
Prior to the granting of adult suffrage in 1944, Veitch was a member of the former Legislative Council, representing the parish of Hanover between 1929 and 1944. In the December 14, 1944 general election, he represented the Alexander Bustamante-led Jamaica Labour Party. Veitch was elected to the House of Representatives from the constituency of Hanover Western, polling 3,200 votes in a crowded field against independents William Dickson (2,421), Walter Tomlinson (1,273), Henry Messam (1,196), and others. A staggering 920 ballots were rejected.

On January 9, 1945 when the House first convened, Veitch was nominated to the position of Speaker by Jehoida McPherson. He was duly confirmed in this position and became the first Speaker of the House of Representatives. However, failing health caused Veitch to serve just two years in Parliament. By May 1945, Clement Aitcheson, the representative from Trelawny Northern was acting as Speaker, over a year before Veitch's death in July 1946.

Awards and honors
 Veitch was posthumously awarded an OBE (Order of the British Empire) by King George VI for public service to Jamaica in 1945

Personal life and death 
Veitch was married to Gladys (née Edwards). He died on July 4, 1946 at the age of 59.

See also
 List of speakers of the House of Representatives of Jamaica

References

1887 births
1946 deaths
Jamaican politicians
Speakers of the House of Representatives of Jamaica
Government ministers of Jamaica
Jamaica Labour Party politicians
Members of the House of Representatives of Jamaica